Mel Thompson may refer to:
 Mel Thompson (writer), English writer and philosopher
 Mel Thompson (basketball), American college basketball player and coach

See also
 Mel Thomson, microbiologist and science communicator
 Meldrim Thomson Jr., governor of New Hampshire